Vice-Admiral Sir Richard Saunders Dundas,  (11 April 1802 – 3 June 1861) was a Royal Navy officer. As a captain, he took part in the capture of the Bogue forts in January 1841, during the First Opium War. He was appointed to the command of the Fleet in the Baltic Sea, in succession to Sir Charles Napier, in February 1855 and led the naval support during the latter stages of the Crimean War, enforcing a strict blockade and carrying out the bombardment of Sveaborg in August 1855. He was appointed First Naval Lord in the first Palmerston ministry in November 1857 and then, after stepping down to be Second Naval Lord during the second Derby–Disraeli ministry, he stepped up again to become First Naval Lord in the second Palmerston ministry in June 1859 remaining in office until his death. The Prime-Minister (Viscount Palmerston) described Dundas as "a most distinguished officer".

Early career

The son of Robert Dundas, 2nd Viscount Melville and his wife Anne (née Huck-Saunders), Dundas was educated at Harrow School and joined the Royal Navy in 1817. After initial training at the Royal Navy College at Portsmouth he joined the frigate HMS Ganymede in the Mediterranean Fleet. Promoted to lieutenant on 16 June 1821 and to commander on 23 June 1823, he was given command of the sloop HMS Sparrowhawk on the North America and West Indies Station in June 1823.

Promoted to captain on 17 July 1824, Dundas took command of the sixth-rate HMS Volage on the North America and West Indies Station in September 1825 and then of the third-rate HMS Warspite on the East Indies Station in December 1826. He became secretary to his father, who was serving a second term as First Lord of the Admiralty, in 1828. He went on to take command of the fifth-rate HMS Belvidera in the Mediterranean Fleet in November 1830 and the third-rate HMS Melville, Flagship of the East Indies Station, in September 1837. In HMS Melville he took part in the capture of the Bogue forts in January 1841 during the First Opium War. He was appointed a Companion of the Order of the Bath on 29 June 1841.

Dundas returned to the Admiralty as Secretary to Lord Haddington, First Lord of the Admiralty, in January 1845 and became Captain of the second-rate HMS Powerful in the Mediterranean Fleet in January 1848.

Senior command

Promoted to rear-admiral on 4 July 1853, Dundas was appointed Third Naval Lord in the Aberdeen ministry in January 1853 and then Second Naval Lord in the same ministry in June 1854. He was appointed to the command of the Baltic Fleet in the Baltic Sea, hoisting his flag in the first-rate HMS Duke of Wellington, in succession to James Dundas in February 1855. Dundas led the naval support during the latter stages of the Crimean War enforcing a strict blockade in the Baltic. Dundas was hesitant but the French admiral Charles Penaud persuaded him to attack the Russian fleet in the harbour of Sweaborg on 9–10 August 1855. The British provided most of the attacking force. Much of the bombardment was done with smaller vessels that the shore batteries found hard to hit. Six Russians ships of the line and 17 smaller warships were destroyed, and the Russians suffered 2,000 casualties. The allies suffered one death, 15 wounded, and damage to only one British sloop.

Dundas was advanced to Knight Commander of the Order of the Bath on 5 February 1856 and became Second-in-command of the Mediterranean Fleet, hoisting his flag in HMS Duke of Wellington, in April 1856. He was also appointed a Grand Officer of the French Legion of Honour on 2 August 1856.

Dundas was appointed Second Naval Lord in the First Palmerston ministry in April 1857 and then First Naval Lord in the same ministry in November 1857. Promoted to vice-admiral on 24 February 1858, Dundas stepped down to be Second Naval Lord in the Second Derby ministry in March 1858. He stepped up again to become First Naval Lord in the Second Palmerston ministry in June 1859 remaining in office until his death. He died, unmarried, of a heart attack at Spring Gardens in London on 3 June 1861. Later that day, the Prime-Minister (Viscount Palmerston) described Vice Admiral Dundas as:
"a most distinguished officer, who was for forty-five years in the service of his country, and who equally distinguished himself in every sphere in which he was called upon to act. He was eminent for the good discipline and order of the ships which he commanded, he was distinguished by the gallantry and good judgment with which he conducted every naval operation in which he was engaged, he was most valuable as a public servant in the direction of naval affairs at the Admiralty. Whether at the Council Board or on the quarter deck his merits were equally eminent, and his services were equally valuable to the country."

His body was returned to the family home, and he is buried beside his father and grandfather in the Dundas Vault in Old Lasswade Kirkyard, close to Melville Castle.

See also

References

Sources

William Loney RN Career History

Further reading
 Russian War, 1855, Baltic: official correspondence [of Sir Richard Saunders Dundas], edited by David Bonner-Smith. Publications of the Navy Records Society, vol. 84. ([London]: Printed for the Navy Records Society, 1944).

|-

|-

|-

|-

|-

1802 births
1861 deaths
People educated at Harrow School
Royal Navy personnel of the First Opium War
Royal Navy personnel of the Crimean War
Knights Commander of the Order of the Bath
Grand Officiers of the Légion d'honneur
Lords of the Admiralty
First Sea Lords and Chiefs of the Naval Staff
Royal Navy vice admirals
Younger sons of viscounts
Richard Saunders Dundas